Daniel Korski CBE (born April 1977) is a former special adviser to Prime Minister David Cameron and is the co-founder and CEO of PUBLIC, a venture capitalist firm focused on helping technology startups transform public services. He is also Chairman and co-founder of the GovTech Summit, an event for the govtech sector.

He has worked as an adviser to Andrew Mitchell MP, the former Conservative Chief Whip, and for the British member of the European Commission, Baroness Ashton, as well as for Edward Llewellyn, during his time as chief of staff to Lord Ashdown, the then-UN High Representative of Bosnia-Herzegovina.

Korski is the son of Polish Jewish refugees, who were expelled from Poland in the late 1960s, and partly grew up in Denmark. He was educated at the London School of Economics, where he gained a first, and at Cambridge University.

As a British official, Korski worked in a number of  positions in London, Washington DC, Iraq, Yemen and Afghanistan. He deployed to Kabul, Afghanistan, in 2005 to advise President Hamid Karzai's government; and in 2007 he ran the Provincial Reconstruction Team in Basra in Iraq, overseeing the post-conflict reconstruction of Basra province during the height of the conflict. He also undertook a secondment to the U.S. State Department under then US Secretary of State Condoleezza Rice. In between these postings, Korski helped establish and was the deputy head of the cross-departmental Stabilisation Unit.

Before working for the British government, Korski worked in the UK Parliament as a policy adviser to the House of Commons Defence Select Committee and in Bosnia-Herzegovina, as Head of Political-Military Affairs in the UN-mandated-Office of the High Representative. In 2008 Korski helped establish the bi-partisan think tank the European Council on Foreign Relations and has written regularly for The Spectator, embedding with the Libyan rebels to report from the start of the country's civil war, and has appeared in The Guardian, Süddeutsche Zeitung,  The New York Times and European Voice.

Korski became a Vice President of the Jewish Leadership Council in June 2019.

References

British political writers
Commanders of the Order of the British Empire
1977 births
Living people
Alumni of the University of Cambridge
British special advisers